Zinder International Airport  is a civil airport serving Zinder, Niger. Owned and formerly managed by the Agence nationale de l'aviation civile du Niger, from 11 February 2020 management has been under the Agency for Aerial Navigation Safety in Africa and Madagascar. Although it is called an "international airport," it generally only handles domestic flights by Niger Airlines that link it to the Diori Hamani International Airport in Niamey, from which several African airports and Paris can be accessed. Cargo is delivered ad hoc. It consists of a single asphalt track 1825 meters long. As of 2018, Zinder Airport handled 30 flights and 2,500 passengers annually.

Airlines and destinations

References

Airports in Niger
Airport